Val Anthony Ronald Lawrence (born November 14, 1965), known professionally as Ron "Amen-Ra" Lawrence, is an American record producer.

Early life
Lawrence was born on the island of Dominica. In 1970, his family immigrated to the United States, settling in East Elmhurst, Queens, in New York City. After high school, he attended Howard University.

In college he met Deric "D-Dot" Angelettie, and formed the rap duo Two Kings in a Cipher, which released the album From Pyramids to Projects. Later, the duo joined the Bad Boy Entertainment production team called "The Hitmen", with fellow Howard University alumnus Sean "Diddy" Combs.

Music career
The Hit Men produced numerous rap and R&B hits of prominent radio play. He is best known for the singles "Hypnotize" by The Notorious B.I.G, "Been Around The World" by Sean "Diddy" Combs, "Where I'm From" by Jay-Z, "Money, Power, Respect" by The Lox, the Grammy-nominated "Love Like This" as well as "All Night Long" by Faith Evans, "Phenomenon" by LL Cool J, "You Should Be Mine" by Brian McKnight, "Can't Let Her Go" by Boyz II Men, "Cold Rock a Party" remix by MC Lyte, and "The Theme (It's Party Time)" by Tracey Lee. He produced the song "Wonderful" for Aretha Franklin for her album So Damn Happy. On June 23, 1998, Lawrence received a Governors Award from the National Academy of Recording Arts & Sciences on.

Lawrence created the hip-hop source score of Spike Lee's film Bamboozled, and appearing in it as a musical engineer. He produced the theme song " A Woman Like Me", by Beyoncé, for the Pink Panther soundtrack. Lawrence himself later studied film at the New York Film Academy and created the short film Founding Fathers, a documentary on hip hop's birth and evolution.

In 2014, Lawrence started a film production company Spotlyte Media. In 2015, he produced and edited the short film Above the Sun. In 2016, he wrote, directed and produced the short film, Angel of Light and the documentary Commutation for Guy Fisher. In 2017, he produced, directed and edited the documentary Rap Dimension, and Rolling Stone published Jay-Z's 50 greatest songs with Lawrence's production coming at number one.

In 2018, he produced and edited the webisode series "Diary of a Music Producer". In 2019, Lawrence published his autobiography titled Where I'm From, a book about his life story growing up in East Elmhurst, his experience at Howard University and creating hits for various musicians. He also appeared in the Netflix series, Hip-Hop Evolution, season 3 episode 2 which is titled Life After Death, covers a segment on Sean "Diddy" Combs and The Hitmen. On November 1, 2019, the action committee of Corona-East Elmhurst Langston Hughes Library honored him with the Community Historian Award at their 50th-anniversary celebration.

Studio album 
With Two Kings in a Cipher
 From Pyramids to Projects (Bahia/RCA, 1991)

References

External links 
Autobiography
Website
Youtube
Ron Lawrence Apparel

1968 births
Living people
High School of Art and Design alumni
American producers
American male songwriters